The 1965 Pacific typhoon season has no official bounds; it ran year-round in 1965, but most tropical cyclones tend to form in the northwestern Pacific Ocean between June and December. These dates conventionally delimit the period of each year when most tropical cyclones form in the northwestern Pacific Ocean.

The scope of this article is limited to the Pacific Ocean, north of the equator and west of the International Date Line. Storms that form east of the date line and north of the equator are called hurricanes; see 1965 Pacific hurricane season. Tropical Storms formed in the entire west pacific basin were assigned a name by the Joint Typhoon Warning Center. Tropical depressions in this basin have the "W" suffix added to their number. Tropical depressions that enter or form in the Philippine area of responsibility are assigned a name by the Philippine Atmospheric, Geophysical and Astronomical Services Administration or PAGASA. This can often result in the same storm having two names.

Systems 

40 tropical depressions formed this year in the Western Pacific, of which 35 became tropical storms. 21 storms reached typhoon intensity, of which a record-tying 11 reached super typhoon strength and 8 reached category 5.

Tropical Depression Atring 

Possibly regenerated into Typhoon Patsy.

Typhoon Patsy (Bining)

Severe Tropical Storm Ruth

CMA Tropical Depression 4 

The depression stayed at sea and it did not last long at all.

Tropical Storm Sarah

Tropical Depression Thelma (Kuring) 

Thelma was short-lived.

Tropical Storm Vera (Daling) 

Vera did not last long.

Severe Tropical Storm Wanda 

Wanda did not impact land.

Typhoon Amy (Elang)

Tropical Depression 08W

Severe Tropical Storm Babe

Severe Tropical Storm Carla (Goring) 
Carla formed with Babe. Carla rapidly intensified on June 1 but then rapidly weakened and then moved northeastward then dissipated on June 3.

CMA Tropical Depression 12

Super Typhoon Dinah (Huling) 

A surge in the southern hemisphere indraft developed into Tropical Depression 11W on June 12 to the east of the Philippines. It tracked west-northwestward, quickly strengthening to a tropical storm that day and a typhoon on the 13th. Dinah continued to quickly intensify as it turned to the northwest, and attained a peak of 185 mph on the 17th to the northeast of Luzon. Its southerly inflow was cut off, and Dinah weakened as it turned to the north. It hit southern Taiwan on the 18th as a 140 mph typhoon, and weakened greatly over the island to a tropical storm. At this time, Dinah exhibited a rare false radar eye. Dinah turned to the northeast, where it became extratropical near Japan on June 20. The storm killed 45 people on its path, and destroyed 5000 homes on Taiwan.

Tropical Storm Emma (Ibiang)

CMA Tropical Depression 15

CMA Tropical Depression 16

Tropical Depression 13W (Luming)

Super Typhoon Freda (Miling) 

160 mph Super Typhoon Freda, which began its life on July 6, hit northern Luzon on the 13th. It crossed the island and the South China Sea, where it hit Hainan Island as a 115 mph typhoon on the 15th. Freda dissipated the next day over China, after causing heavy flooding killing an unknown number of people. In Hong Kong, Freda killed 2 people.

CMA Tropical Depression 18 

The depression stayed away from land, yet it did not last long.

Severe Tropical Storm Gilda (Narsing) 

Gilda did not last long, although it caused some damage.

CMA Tropical Depression 20 

The depression did not last long.

Typhoon Harriet (Openg) 

Harriet hit Taiwan as a Category 3 typhoon.

Super Typhoon Jean (Rubing) 

Super Typhoon Jean, after reaching a peak of 160 mph on August 3, weakened slightly to hit southwestern Japan as a 150 mph super typhoon on August 5. The typhoon brought heavy winds to Southern Japan before becoming extratropical on the 7th. Typhoon Jean killed 28 people throughout Southern Japan.

Typhoon Ivy (Pining) 

Ivy did a loop and only survived 5 days before dissipating.

Severe Tropical Storm Kim 

Kim stayed at sea.

Super Typhoon Lucy 

On August 14 a tropical depression formed and was named Lucy after it became a tropical storm. Lucy became a typhoon and soon into a 175 mph super typhoon. Lucy weakened and struck Japan as a minimal typhoon. Lucy dissipated on August 24.

Super Typhoon Mary (Saling) 

175 mph Super Typhoon Mary weakened from its peak to hit eastern Taiwan on August 18 as a 105 mph typhoon. The typhoon brought strong winds and heavy rain before dissipating over China on the 20th.

Tropical Storm Nadine

Super Typhoon Olive

Tropical Storm Polly (Tasing)

Typhoon Rose (Unding)

Super Typhoon Shirley 

130 mph Typhoon Shirley, after weakening from a peak of 150 mph, hit southern Japan on September 10, causing moderate damage and heavy rain. Resulting floods and landslides killed 67 people and left 6 missing.

Super Typhoon Trix (Walding) 

Typhoon Trix struck central Honshū Island in Japan just days after Typhoon Shirley. Trix caused heavy rains 98 people were killed and 9 were missing due to the resulting flooding and landslides.

Severe Tropical Storm Virginia

Severe Tropical Storm Wendy (Yeyeng)

Tropical Storm Agnes 

Tropical Storm Agnes struck Hong Kong killing 5 people.

Super Typhoon Bess 

Bess was the strongest storm of the season. The storm formed on September 27 northeast of Palau and dissipated on October 6 north of Japan.

Super Typhoon Carmen

Tropical Depression Anding 
Anding did not last long.

Typhoon Della 

Della stayed at sea.

Tropical Storm Elaine

Super Typhoon Faye (Binang)

Tropical Depression Gloria

Storm names

Philippines

Used Names

Unused names 

The Philippine Atmospheric, Geophysical and Astronomical Services Administration uses its own naming scheme for tropical cyclones in their area of responsibility. PAGASA assigns names to tropical depressions that form within their area of responsibility and any tropical cyclone that might move into their area of responsibility. Should the list of names for a given year prove to be insufficient, names are taken from an auxiliary list, the first 6 of which are published each year before the season starts. Names not retired from this list will be used again in the 1969 season. PAGASA uses its own naming scheme that starts in the Filipino alphabet, with names of Filipino female names ending with "ng" (A, B, K, D, etc.).

See also 

 1965 Atlantic hurricane season
 Australian cyclone seasons: 1964–65, 1965–66
 South Pacific cyclone seasons: 1964–65, 1965–66
 South-West Indian Ocean cyclone seasons: 1964–65, 1965–66

References

External links 
 Japan Meteorological Agency
 Joint Typhoon Warning Center .
 China Meteorological Agency
 National Weather Service Guam
 Hong Kong Observatory
 Macau Meteorological Geophysical Services
 Korea Meteorological Agency
 Philippine Atmospheric, Geophysical and Astronomical Services Administration
 Taiwan Central Weather Bureau
 Digital Typhoon - Typhoon Images and Information
 Typhoon2000 Philippine typhoon website